The Gaelic Grounds, know for sponsorshop reasons as the TUS Gaelic Grounds, is the principal GAA stadium in the Irish city of Limerick, home to the Limerick hurling and football teams. It has a capacity of 44,023.

History
9 October 1926 saw first steps taken towards creating the Limerick Gaelic Grounds as a GAA stadium of note. A farm containing  was purchased at Coolraine on the Ennis Road for development as a sporting grounds. Two years later the new grounds officially opened with two junior hurling games. The first big effort to raise funds for the development of the grounds was in 1932, with the establishment of a development committee, whose remit was to level the pitch, providing sideline seating and erect a boundary wall. The 1950s saw crowds of up to 50,000 attending games in the grounds. 1958 saw a new stand being built at Páirc na nGael – it was the Old Hogan Stand from Croke Park. A record paid attendance of 61,174 witnessed the Munster hurling final between Cork and Tipperary at the stadium in 1961 and it is estimated that another 10,000 spectators piled in without paying after the gates were broken down.

In 1979, a major decision was taken to update the grounds completely. It took three years before plans were drawn up for a new stand and in 1986, planning permission was granted by Limerick Corporation for the Mick Mackey Stand. The updated stand was completed in 1988, just in time for the Munster hurling final. In 2004, the biggest rejuvenation of the stadium was completed with the opening of the new uncovered 12,000 seater Angela's Ashes stand along with two new terraces behind both goals at a cost of €12 million. This brought the capacity of the Gaelic Grounds to 49,866.

The stadium has also hosted a game in the International Rules Series between Australia and Ireland. The hybrid game was played outside Croke Park for only the second time on Irish soil, with Pearse Stadium in Galway the other previous host.
In 2014, the stadium played host to the All Ireland SFC semi-final replay between Mayo and Kerry, the first time in over thirty years a semi final of the SFC has been played outside Croke Park

In 2019, Limerick GAA and Limerick Institute of Technology (LIT) entered a major partnership agreement, the first of its kind in Ireland, which included the renaming of the stadium as LIT Gaelic Grounds. The partnership included elements such as a scholarship scheme, student internships and shared facilities.

During the COVID-19 pandemic, Gaelic Grounds was used as a drive-through test centre.

College football
LIT Gaelic Grounds has hosted two American college football games, called the Wild Geese Classic. The first Wild Geese Classic was in 1991 between Fordham and Holy Cross for the Ram-Crusader Cup.

See also
 List of Gaelic Athletic Association stadiums
 List of stadiums in Ireland by capacity

References

External links
 World Stadium Article

Gaelic games grounds in the Republic of Ireland
Limerick GAA
Sports venues in Limerick (city)
Sports venues in County Limerick